Frederick Percival Emberton (23 June 1884–1957) was an English footballer who played in the Football League for Notts County.

References

1884 births
1957 deaths
English footballers
Association football midfielders
English Football League players
Stafford Rangers F.C. players
Notts County F.C. players